The David Amar Worldwide North Africa Jewish Heritage Center is a cultural centre and museum in Jerusalem, opened in 2011.

It is located in the heart of the Mahane Israel (also Mahaneh Yisrael) neighborhood established in 1865, and is housed in the quarter's oldest building, built in the mid-19th century by David ben Shimon, who founded the community of North African Jews in Jerusalem.

The museum has permanent and temporary exhibitions focused on the history and heritage of the Jewish communities of North Africa, particularly Morocco, Algeria and Tunisia.

The restoration was funded by the Casablanca, Morocco-based businessman David Amar, and was renamed in his honour. Work took four years and required a team of Moroccan craftsmen to create the intricate zellige mosaic tile work.

Reconstructing the building in an authentic Moroccan style was controversial, as some saw it as "importing foreign architecture and damaging a historic building", but it is expected to become one of Jerusalem's top tourist sites.

It was opened in June 2011 in the presence of President Shimon Peres and former President Yitzhak Navon.

References

External links

Museums in Jerusalem
History museums in Israel
North African-Jewish culture in Israel